Aarhus River is a  long river or stream, in eastern Jutland, Denmark.

The river flows through the large river valley of Aarhus Ådal. The valley itself, stretches from Silkeborg to the coastal city of Aarhus, but the Aarhus River only runs through the easternmost parts. The river defines the border between Skanderborg and Aarhus Municipality during its first few kilometres.

History 

Aarhus River has been important for the development of the city of Aarhus since its foundation in the early Viking Age, and archaeological and historical research suggests that it played a crucial role in the origins of the city.

There used to be a sizeable catch of eel, and to a lesser degree pike, in the Aarhus River up until the later part of the 20th century. Several families, often based at the rivers' watermills, made a living from it with the Brabrand Lake as the most productive fishing spot. As seen the world over, eel went into a rapid decline and with it the local fishing industry in the Aarhus River dried up. Through the 20th century, the river and its ecosystem went into a serious decline due to nutrient pollution from household wastewater and farmland run-off. Today, after some costly efforts to restore the damaging effects of the destructive eutrofication, the ecosystem and biodiversity of the Aarhus River is recovering and now includes a wide range of fish species once again. Two former fish farms along the Aarhus River at Pinds Mølle and Gammel Harlev has been re-purposed as put-and-take spots with trout for sports fishing.

With the advance of the automobile, the river's run through the city of Aarhus was paved over and covered by roads in the years 1930-1958. In the process, the last long stretch was named Åboulevarden and created a new transport route to the thriving industrial harbour. In 1989, it was politically decided that Aarhus River should be opened again, and the project commenced in September 2005. In 2008, the reopened section of the river at Åboulevarden was inaugurated, and work on the last section at the harbor front began, finishing in 2015.

Gallery

References

Sources 

 Søren Olsen: "Danmarks Søer og Åer"  
 Fode, Henrik (red.): "Århus Å - Natur og mennesker", Århus Byhistoriske Fond (2009) 
 Barbara Højlund & Frederik Schildt Nabe-Nielsen (2011): Århus Viking Ship Museum 
 Christina Jessen (2011): Aarhus Danmarkshistorien.dk, Aarhus University

External links 
 Århus Å Den Gamle By. Paintings of the Aarhus through the ages. 
 Aarhus Danmarkshistorien.dk, Aarhus University 

Geography of Aarhus
Aarhus Municipality
Skanderborg Municipality
Rivers of Jutland